The 2013–14 Martyr's Memorial A-Division League season, also known as the Martyrs' Memorial Red Bull 'A' Division League Football Tournament 2013–14 for sponsorship reasons, was the 41st edition of the Martyr's Memorial A-Division League since its establishment in 1954/55. A total of 13 teams competed in the league. The season began on 30 December 2013 and concluded on 1 March 2014.

Three Star Club were the defending champions. Manang Marshyangdi Club won the title for the record 7th time.

Teams
Of the 13 participating teams, twelve remained following the 2012–13 Martyr's Memorial A-Division League. They are joined by one team promoted from the 2013 Martyr's Memorial B-Division League.

Boys Union Club were promoted from the 2013 Martyr's Memorial B-Division League. Whereas, Madhyapur Youth Association, Bansbari Football Club and Boudha Football Club were relegated to the 2014 Martyr's Memorial B-Division League.

New Road Team had to withdraw from the competition due to financial reasons and was relegated to the Martyr's Memorial B-Division League.

League table

Super League

Top scorers
Accurate as of July 2014.

Awards

References

External links

RSSF

Martyr's Memorial A-Division League seasons
1
Nepal